Chapman Township may refer to:

Canada 
 Chapman Township, Ontario, now part of the township of Magnetawan

United States 
 Chapman Township, Clay County, Kansas
 Chapman Township, Ottawa County, Kansas, in Ottawa County, Kansas
 Chapman Township, Merrick County, Nebraska
 Chapman Township, Saunders County, Nebraska
 Chapman Township, Clinton County, Pennsylvania
 Chapman Township, Snyder County, Pennsylvania

Township name disambiguation pages